Cook Out is a privately owned American fast-food restaurant chain operating in North Carolina, South Carolina, Alabama, Georgia, Kentucky, Maryland, Tennessee, Virginia, West Virginia, and Mississippi. Founded in Greensboro, North Carolina in 1989, the chain has since expanded and now has restaurants in over 100 cities.  The chain itself has grown in size with many locations now spread throughout the Southeastern US.  

The standard format of the restaurant features two drive-thru lanes and a walk-up window, but no indoor seating.  Some newer locations have an indoor dining room and counter service similar to a traditional fast-food restaurant, but most still only have drive-thru and walk-up service.  The restaurant specializes in hamburgers, milkshakes, and North Carolina-style pork barbecue.

History

Morris Reaves founded Cook Out in 1989. He is currently the owner of the company, with his son, Jeremy Reaves, serving as the CEO.

The first Cook Out location opened in Greensboro, North Carolina in 1989. After opening the first location, over 50 more locations opened in North Carolina before expanding out of the state. As of Nov 2022, 326 locations are operating in ten states.

The company opened its first out-of-state store in Spartanburg, South Carolina, on July 30, 2010. Cook Out opened in Clemson and Orangeburg, South Carolina, in 2010. At the very end of 2011, Cook Out opened restaurants in Columbia, South Carolina; Blacksburg, Virginia; and Radford, Virginia. In March 2012, Cook Out opened its first location in Lynchburg, Virginia, and shortly thereafter in Harrisonburg, Virginia. 2013 saw new Cook Out locations in Georgia, and in 2014, there are plans to launch several more Georgia Cook Out locations. In 2016, Cook Out expanded into the state of Mississippi with stores in Oxford, Jackson, Hattiesburg, and Starkville, and the company's first Alabama location, in Tuscaloosa. Other locations in Alabama include Jacksonville (July 2017), Auburn (Dec 2017), Huntsville (Jan 2018), Opelika (May 2018), Troy (June 2018), Mobile (Dec 2018), Montgomery (Jan 2019) & Birmingham (Jan 2021). In 2018, Cook Out expanded its Virginia locations adding Collinsville which opened in September 2019. In November 2022, Cook Out opened a restaurant in Manassas Park, Virginia.

Menu 

Their menu primarily features grilled hamburgers and cheeseburgers, hot dogs, chicken sandwiches, North Carolina barbecue and quesadillas. A signature to their menu is the Cook Out Tray, which features combinations of entrees, sides and a drink or milkshake. Another feature of Cook Out's menu is their selection of more than 40 flavors of milkshakes. A featured drink on their menu is Cheerwine, a local North Carolina cherry soda usually only served in North Carolina and surrounding states.

References

External links

Companies based in Greensboro, North Carolina
Restaurants in North Carolina
Economy of the Southeastern United States
Regional restaurant chains in the United States
Fast-food chains of the United States
Fast-food hamburger restaurants
Restaurants established in 1989
1989 establishments in North Carolina